Uncula is a genus of moths of the family Noctuidae. The genus was described by Charles Swinhoe in 1900.

Species
Uncula herbaria (Swinhoe, 1886) India (Madhya Pradesh)
Uncula tristigmatias (Hampson, 1902) Sudan, Kenya, Uganda, Zimbabwe

References

Acontiinae